The International Center for Responsible Gaming (ICRG), formerly known as the National Center for Responsible Gambling (NCRG), is an American nonprofit group that funds scientific research on gambling addiction. It was founded in 1996 as a separate 501(c)(3) charitable organization. The group is a wing of the American Gaming Association, the casino industry's main trade group. The mission of this organization is to help people who suffer from gambling disorders. The ICRG does that by conducting scientific research into pathological and youth gambling, as well as encouraging the application of new research findings to improve prevention, diagnostic, intervention, and treatment strategies. It was renamed the International Center for Responsible Gambling on January 1, 2020, to reflect its broader scope, including countries other than the United States.

The ICRG (then known as the NCRG) founded the Institute for Research on Pathological Gambling and Related Disorders (IRPGRD) in 2000. Since the establishment of the organization, almost $25 million has been committed to the ICRG. As of 2008, the IRPGRD was dependent on casino funding, channeled through the NCRG. This arrangement has led some critics to question the independence of the IRPGRD's research. IRPGRD executive director Christine Reilly told Salon.com that the institute's contract with the NCRG stipulates that the industry not interfere with its work. However, Salon concluded that:
 While NCRG leaders say they fund independent science, it's not a coincidence that the science aligns so well with the interests of the casinos. It's not that gambling executives are tampering with research findings, or scientists are skewing results. Rather, gaming executives are drawing extravagant conclusions from the studies. By trumpeting these conclusions, the gaming industry is helping casinos gain a legal foothold across the country -- and covering up the ways casinos profit from gambling addiction.

Structure

The ICRG is overseen by four board officers and nine board of directors. The member board includes representatives from the gaming industry, public health officials as well as regulatory communities.

Board Officers:

Chairman - Alan M. Feldman- Executive Vice President of Global Government and Industry Affairs MGM Resorts International
President - Phil Satre Chairman- International Game Technology
President-Emeritus - William S. Boyd- Executive Chairman Boyd Gaming Corporation
Secretary and Treasurer - Christine Reilly-Senior Research Director International Center for Responsible Gaming

Resources

ICRG provides resources that help raise public awareness surrounding gambling disorders, by promoting various ideas within the field of gambling research as well as help deliver resources for those are interested in this issue. The resources include links for disordered gamblers, treatment providers, the gaming industry, other organizations, as well as presentations, speeches, and news about responsible gaming and gambling disorders.

Educational programs

Since one of ICRG’s missions is to educate the public about responsible gaming, as well as gambling disorders, they provide educational programs surrounding this issue:

Collegegambling.org - a website that provides free resources that are designed to give students, parents, campus administrators, and student health professional the tools they need to address gambling on college campuses across the country
EMERGE (Executive, Management & Employee Responsible Gaming Education) - the only employee training program that is based on scientific research which has been translated into an accessible training tool for gaming employees at all levels
Talking with Children About Gambling- Uses research-based guides that are designed to help parents, as well as others who work with youth, to discourage children from gambling and recognize possible warning signs of gambling problems as well as other risky behaviors
ICRG Conference on Gambling and Addiction- a conference conducted by the ICRG to bring clinicians, public policymakers, industry representatives, researchers as well as other stakeholders to discuss the concerns around gambling disorder research as well as responsible gaming
THE ICRG Webinar Series- provides a year-round educational opportunities that are designed to help individuals address and understand critical issues that are related to gambling as well as responsible

References

External links
International Center for Responsible Gaming

Charities based in Massachusetts
Problem gambling organizations